Ismar David (27 August 191026 February 1996) was a calligrapher, graphic designer, and type designer.

Ismar David was born on 27 August 1910, in Breslau (Wrocław), then part of the German Empire, to Rosa and Wolff David. He was apprenticed to a house painter in Breslau from 1925 to 1928, when he went to Berlin. There, he went to art school at Städtische Kunstgewerbe- und Handwerkerschule in Charlottenburg.

He left school in 1932 and moved to Jerusalem, then under the Mandate for Palestine, where he worked with the Jewish National Fund to design golden books—works in which the fund's donors were profiled. While in Jerusalem, David designed a typeface for the Hebrew language called David Hebrew. David settled permanently in New York City in 1953. David's art often accompanied religious texts.

He died on 26 February 1996 in New York City.

Publications 
 The Hebrew Letter: Calligraphic Variations (1990)

Citations

Works cited 
 
 

1910 births
1996 deaths
American graphic designers
German emigrants to the United States
People from Wrocław